Bechlín is a municipality and village in Litoměřice District in the Ústí nad Labem Region of the Czech Republic. It has about 1,300 inhabitants.

Administrative parts
The village of Předonín is an administrative part of Bechlín.

References

Villages in Litoměřice District